Land of the Lawless is a 1947 American Western film directed by Lambert Hillyer and written by J. Benton Cheney. The film stars Johnny Mack Brown, Raymond Hatton, Christine McIntyre, Tris Coffin, June Harrison, and Marshall Reed. The film was released on April 26, 1947, by Monogram Pictures.

Plot

Cast             
Johnny Mack Brown as Johnny Mack
Raymond Hatton as Bodie
Christine McIntyre as Kansas City Kate
Tris Coffin as Cameo Carson
June Harrison as Donna
Marshall Reed as Yuma 
I. Stanford Jolley as Cherokee Kid
Steve Clark as Jason
Edmund Cobb as Hank
Roy Butler as Doc Cassidy
Cactus Mack as Dave
Gary Garrett as Clem

References

External links
 

1947 films
American Western (genre) films
1947 Western (genre) films
Monogram Pictures films
Films directed by Lambert Hillyer
American black-and-white films
1940s English-language films
1940s American films